Matthias Döschner (born 12 January 1958) is a former German footballer.

He spent much of his career with SG Dynamo Dresden, playing 253 matches in the DDR-Oberliga. After the Wende Döschner was under contract at SC Fortuna Köln.

He also won 40 caps for East Germany.

References

External links
 
 
 

1958 births
Living people
German footballers
East German footballers
East Germany international footballers
Association football defenders
Association football midfielders
Dynamo Dresden players
Dynamo Dresden II players
SC Fortuna Köln players
2. Bundesliga players
Dynamo Dresden non-playing staff
DDR-Oberliga players
People from Dohna
Footballers from Saxony
People from Bezirk Dresden